is a prefecture of Japan located in the Kansai region of Honshu. Wakayama Prefecture borders Osaka Prefecture to the north, and Mie Prefecture and Nara Prefecture to the northeast.

Wakayama is the capital and largest city of Wakayama Prefecture, with other major cities including Tanabe, Hashimoto, and Kinokawa. Wakayama Prefecture is located on the western coast of the Kii Peninsula on the Kii Channel, connecting the Pacific Ocean and Seto Inland Sea, across from Tokushima Prefecture on the island of Shikoku.

History 

Present-day Wakayama is mostly the western part of the province of Kii.

1953 flood disaster 
On July 17–18, 1953, a torrential heavy rain occurred, followed by collapse of levees, river flooding and landslides in a wide area. Many bridges and houses were destroyed. According to an officially confirmed report by the Government of Japan, 1,015 people died, with 5,709 injured and 7,115 houses lost.

Geography 

As of 31 March 2020, 13 percent of the total land area of the prefecture was designated as Natural Parks, namely the Setonaikai and Yoshino-Kumano National Parks; Kongō-Ikoma-Kisen and Kōya-Ryūjin Quasi-National Parks; and Enju Kaigan, Hatenashi Sanmyaku, Hikigawa, Jōgamori Hokodai, Kōyasanchō Ishimichi-Tamagawakyō, Kozagawa, Nishiarida, Oishi Kōgen, Ōtōsan, Ryūmonzan, Shiramisan-Wadagawakyō, and Shirasaki Kaigan Prefectural Natural Parks.

Cities

Nine cities are in Wakayama Prefecture:

Towns and villages
These are the towns and villages in each district:

Mergers

Demographics 

Since 1996, population of Wakayama Prefecture has kept declining, and since 2010, it has been the only prefecture in Kansai region with population below 1,000,000. In 2017, Wakayama is ranked 40th by population in Japan with a population of 944,320. In the 2020 census, close to 32% of the population was over 65 years of age - the highest percentage in Japan and one of the highest for national subdivisions worldwide.

Politics

List of governors of Wakayama
State-appointed governors:

 Masaomi Tsuda: from 25 November 1871 to 25 January 1872
 Hidetomo Kitajima: from 25 January 1872 to 13 October 1873
 Kunikiyo Kōyama: from 13 October 1873 to 20 October 1873
 Kanae Matsumoto: from 20 October 1873 to 26 December 1889
 Tadaakira Ishii: from 26 December 1889 to 9 April 1891
 Sadaaki Senda: from 9 April 1891 to 15 January 1892
 Morikata Oki: from 15 January 1892 to 7 April 1897
 Kan'ichi Kubota: from 7 April 1897 to 8 October 1898
 Masaaki Nomura: from 8 October 1898 to 7 April 1899
 Hisashi Ogura: from 7 April 1899 to 25 October 1900
 Shin'ichirō Tsubaki: from 25 October 1900 to 29 June 1903
 Ienori Kiyosu: from 29 June 1903 to 11 January 1907
 Takio Izawa: from 11 January 1907 to 30 July 1909
 Chikaharu Kawakami: from 30 July 1909 to 4 September 1911
 Takeji Kawamura: from 4 September 1911 to 9 June 1914
 Kogorō Kanokogi: from June 1914 to 17 December 1917
 Tokikazu Ikematsu: from 17 December 1917 to 3 February 1920
 Shinzō Obara: from 3 February 1920 to 6 June 1923
 Yoshibumi Satake: from 6 June 1923 to 24 June 1924

 Kyūichi Hasegawa: from 24 June 1924 to 22 March 1927
 Tokutarō Shimizu: from 22 March 1927 to 17 May 1927
 Umekichi Miyawaki: from 17 May 1927 to 17 November 1927
 Taeru Node: from 17 November 1927 to 5 July 1929
 Senzō Tomobe: from 5 July 1929 to 26 August 1930
 Toshikatsu Kurahara: from 26 August 1930 to 18 December 1931
 Toshiki Karasawa: from 18 December 1931 to 28 July 1932
 Ryōsaku Shimizu: from 28 July 1932 to 10 November 1934
 Nagakazu Fujioka: from 10 November 1934 to 22 April 1936
 Tokiji Yoshinaga: from 22 April 1936 to 11 January 1939
 Shigeo Shimizu: from 11 January 1939 to 15 October 1940
 Jirō Imamatsu: from 15 October 1940 to 20 October 1941
 Seizō Hirose: from 20 October 1941 to 1 August 1944
 Chiaki Kobayashi: from 1 August 1944 to 27 October 1945
 Uichirō Koike: from 27 October 1945 to 25 January 1946
 Masao Kanai: from 25 January 1946 to 8 July 1946
 Wakichi Kawakami: from 8 July 1946 to 28 February 1947
 Yoshimaro Takahashi: from 28 February 1947 to 15 April 1947

Publicly-elected governors:

 Shinji Ono: from 19 April 1947 to 22 April 1967
 Masao Ohashi: from 23 April 1967 to 4 October 1975
 Shiro Kariya: from 23 November 1975 to 22 November 1995
 Isamu Nishiguchi: from 23 November 1995 to 13 July 2000

 Yoshiki Kimura: from 3 September 2000 to 2 December 2006
 Yoshinobu Nisaka: from 17 December 2006 to 16 December 2022
 Shūhei Kishimoto: from 17 December 2022 to present

Culture 
 in the Ito District is the headquarters of the Shingon sect of Japanese Buddhism. It is home to one of the first Japanese style Buddhist temples in Japan and remains a pilgrimage site and an increasingly popular tourist destination as people flock to see its ancient temples set amidst the towering cedar trees at the top of the mountain. The Sacred sites and pilgrimage routes in the Kii Mountain Range extend for miles throughout the prefecture and together have been recognized as Japan's 11th UNESCO World Heritage Site.

The Kumano Shrines are on the southern tip of the prefecture. Tomogashima (a cluster of four islands) is part of the prefecture.

Agriculture

Orange 
Wakayama Prefecture ranks first in the production of oranges in Japan. Wakayama has its own brand of oranges, which is produced in Arida District and called 'Arida-Orange'. Arida District, where oranges have been produced for more than 400 years, yields about half of the orange crops in Wakayama today. Furthermore, the yield of Arida-Oranges accounts for about 10 percent of Japanese domestic production of oranges.

Japanese apricot (Ume) 
As of 2016, Wakayama made up about 70 percent of Japanese domestic production of Japanese apricots.

Sister relationships 
Wakayama Prefecture has friendship and sister relationships with six places outside Japan:Shandong, People's Republic of China; Pyrénées-Orientales, France; Florida, United States; Sinaloa, Mexico; Galicia, Spain and Sichuan, People's Republic of China.

Tourism 
Wakayama Prefecture has hot springs such as Shirahama, Kawayu, and Yunomine Onsen.

Transportation

Rail 
 JR West
 Hanwa Line
 Kinokuni Line
 Wakayama Line
 JR Central
 Kisei Line
 Nankai
 Nankai Line
 Koya Line
 Kada Line
 Kishu Railway
 Wakayama Electric Railway

Road

Expressway 
 Hanwa Expressway
 Keinawa Expressway
 Yuasa Gobo Road
 Nachi Katsuura Road

National Highway 
 Route 24
 Route 26
 Route 42
 Route 168 (Shingu-Gojo-Ikoma-Hirakata)
 Route 169 (Shingu-Kumano-Kawakami-Yoshino-Asuka-Kashihara-Nara)
 Route 311 (Kamitonda-Tanabe-Shingu-kumano-Owase)
 Route 370 (Kainan-Hashimoto-Gojo-Uda-Nara)
 Route 371 (Kawachinagano-Hashimoto-Koya-Kushimoto)
 Route 424

Ferry 
 Wakayama-Tokushima

Airport 
 Nanki Shirahama Airport

Education

Universities 
 Wakayama University
 Koyasan University
 Kinki University
 Wakayama Medical University

Notes

References
 Nussbaum, Louis-Frédéric and Käthe Roth. (2005).  Japan encyclopedia. Cambridge: Harvard University Press. ; OCLC 58053128

External links 

Official Wakayama Prefecture homepage
Wakayama Tourist Guide
Nanki Sightseeing Guide

 
Kansai region
Prefectures of Japan